Bormio is a town and comune with a population of about 4,100 located in the Province of Sondrio, Lombardy region of the Alps in northern Italy.

The centre of the upper Valtellina valley, it is a popular winter sports resort. It was the site of the Alpine World Ski Championships in 1985 and 2005, and annually hosts the Alpine Ski World Cup. In addition to modern skiing facilities, the town is noted for the presence of several hot springs that have been tapped to provide water to three thermal baths.

Geography 

Bormio lies in the northeast of the Lombardy region at the top of the Valtellina, a broad glacial valley formed by the Adda River that flows down into Lake Como. It is linked to other valleys via four passes:
 South Tyrol via the Stelvio Pass
 Val Müstair via the Umbrail Pass
 Livigno via the Foscagno Pass
 Ponte di Legno via the Gavia Pass

History 

Due to its thermal baths at Bagni Vecchi, Bagni Nuovi and Terme di Bormio, Bormio has long been a tourist attraction. Members of the Roman aristocracy already travelled to Bormio in order to enjoy warm baths in the mountainous scenery. Most of these thermal baths are still in use today.

The town is centred on the historic Piazza Cavour and Via Roma, a historic main trading point on the route from Venice to Switzerland. Bormio retains its unique medieval town centre, attracting many tourists, mainly Italian, from Milan and other cities. It will host alpine skiing in the 2026 Winter Olympics.

Alpine skiing
The village hosted the FIS Alpine World Ski Championships twice, in 1985 and 2005, both cohosted with Santa Caterina di Valfurva.

Bormio is a regular stop on the World Cup circuit, usually with a men's downhill in late December. The Pista Stelvio, named after Stelvio Pass, is one of the most challenging downhill courses in the world; it is second-longest on the World Cup circuit, behind only the Lauberhorn in Wengen, Switzerland.

Main sights 
 Giardino Botanico Alpino "Rezia"

People 
 The Olympic skiing brothers Erminio, Giacinto and Stefano Sertorelli were born in Bormio.
 The head coach of the Italian national ski team in 1970–1976, Oreste Peccedi, was born and resides.
 The Italian ski mountaineers Francesca Martinelli and Roberta Pedranzini were born in Bormio.
 The 6 times world champion runner Marco De Gasperi was born in Bormio.

Twin cities and towns

Bormio is twinned with:
 Huez, France, since 2005.
 Qakh, Azerbaijan, since 2014.
 Bellpuig, Spain

References

External links 
Bormio online
Bormio.it
Bormio3.it
Therme in Bormio
Collection of videos of skiing in Bormio
Sci Club Bormio
Official Site of the Ski Areas
Official Site of the Bormio Tourist Office
Alta Valtellina Tourism
Alta Rezia News Paper online
Bormio ski resort guide, news&events...

Cities and towns in Lombardy
Ski areas and resorts in Italy
Spa towns in Italy
Venues of the 2026 Winter Olympics